Derek Lee or Derrek Lee may refer to:

 Derrek Lee (born 1975), former Major League Baseball first baseman from 1997 to 2011
 Derek Lee (baseball) (born 1966), former Major League Baseball outfielder in 1993
 Derek Lee (American football) (born 1981), wide receiver
 Derek Lee (politician) (born 1948), lawyer and politician in Canada
 Derek Lee (biologist) (born 1971), ecologist
 Derek Lee, character in the film Afflicted
 Derek Lee Nixon, American actor
 Derek Lee Ragin (born 1958), American countertenor
 Derek Lee Shelton (born 1970), American baseball player and coach

See also
Derrick Lee (disambiguation)